Edinburgh South was a constituency of the Scottish Parliament (Holyrood). It elected one Member of the Scottish Parliament (MSP) by the plurality (first past the post) method of election. Also, however, it was one of nine constituencies in the Lothians electoral region, which elected seven additional members, in addition to nine constituency MSPs, to produce a form of proportional representation for the region as a whole.

For the Scottish Parliament election, 2011, Edinburgh South was redrawn and replaced by the renamed Edinburgh Southern constituency.

Electoral region 

The other eight constituencies of the Lothians region were: Edinburgh Central, Edinburgh East and Musselburgh, Edinburgh North and Leith, Edinburgh Pentlands, Edinburgh West, Linlithgow, Livingston and Midlothian.

The region covered the City of Edinburgh council area, the West Lothian council area, part of the Midlothian council area, and part of the East Lothian council area.

Constituency boundaries and council area 

The Edinburgh South constituency was created at the same time as the Scottish Parliament, in 1999, with the name and boundaries of an  existing Westminster constituency. In 2005, however, Scottish Westminster (House of Commons) constituencies were mostly replaced with new constituencies.

The Holyrood constituency covered a southern portion of the City of Edinburgh council area. The rest of the city area is covered by five other constituencies, all also in the Lothians electoral region: Edinburgh West, Edinburgh Central, Edinburgh Pentlands, Edinburgh North and Leith, and Edinburgh East and Musselburgh.

Edinburgh South had boundaries with the Edinburgh West constituency, the Edinburgh Central constituency, and the Edinburgh East and Musselburgh constituency.

Edinburgh East and Musselburgh also covered the Musselburgh portion of the East Lothian council area. The rest of the East Lothian area was covered by the East Lothian constituency, which is in the South of Scotland electoral region.

Wards 

Edinburgh South included the wards of Alnwickhill, Gilmerton, Kaimes, Marchmont, Merchiston, Moredun, Newington, North Morningside and the Grange, Prestonfield, and Sciennes, and part of the South Morningside ward,  which is split with Edinburgh Pentlands. The wards were created in 1999, at the same time as the constituency, and are due to be replaced with new wards in 2007, without change to constituency boundaries.

To create the new "Edinburgh Southern" for the 2011 Scottish Parliament election, the electoral wards used are Sighthill / Gorgie; Fountainbridge / Craiglockhart; Meadows / Morningside; Southside / Newington; Liberton / Gilmerton; Portobello / Craigmillar. All these wards are divided between Southern and neighbouring constituencies, not one is contained whole within the new boundaries.

Constituency profile 

Edinburgh South was predominantly suburban. It included Marchmont, Merchiston, Newington, the Grange, Sciennes and a northern area of Morningside, Moredun, Little France, Inch and Gilmerton.

Members of the Scottish Parliament

Election results

Footnotes

See also
 Bruntsfield, Edinburgh
 Morningside, Edinburgh
 Politics of Edinburgh

Scottish Parliament constituencies and regions 1999–2011
Constituencies in Edinburgh
1999 establishments in Scotland
Constituencies established in 1999
2011 disestablishments in Scotland
Constituencies disestablished in 2011